Reedham Swing Bridge, on the site of a Victorian swing bridge, is still in use at Reedham, Norfolk, England.

It carries the Wherry railway line, between Norwich and Lowestoft, across the River Yare near Reedham railway station.

The original single track bridge was commissioned by Sir Samuel Morton Peto in the 1840s to allow the passage of wherry boats, which were too tall to pass under conventional bridges. The current bridge dates from 1902–3 prior to the doubling of the track.

The bridge is operated from the 1904 Reedham Swing Bridge signal box. In a typical year, it is opened 1,300 times.

References 

Bridges completed in the 1840s
Bridges completed in 1903
Swing bridges in England
Railway bridges in Norfolk